KZXT is a radio station airing an adult contemporary format licensed to Eureka, Montana, broadcasting on 93.5 MHz FM.  The station is owned by Anderson Radio Broadcasting, Inc.

References

External links
KZXT's official website

Mainstream adult contemporary radio stations in the United States
ZXT